Goodenia pusilla is a species of flowering plant in the family Goodeniaceae and is endemic to the southwest of Western Australia. It is an ascending herb with lance-shaped to egg-shaped leaves at the base of the plant and single yellow flowers with brownish markings.

Description

Taxonomy and naming
This species was first formally described in 1845 by Willem Hendrik de Vriese in Lehmann's Plantae Preissianae and was given the name Scaevola pusilla. In 1854, de Vriese changed the name to Goodenia pusilla. The specific epithet (pusilla) means "very small".

Distribution and habitat
This goodenia grows in moist places in forest, woodland and swamp between Gingin and Albany in the south-west of Western Australia.

Conservation status
Goodenia pusilla is classified as "not threatened" by the Department of Biodiversity, Conservation and Attractions.

References

pusilla
Endemic flora of Western Australia
Plants described in 1845
Taxa named by Willem Hendrik de Vriese